Metaprionota is a monotypic moth genus of the family Erebidae erected by George Hampson in 1926. Its only species, Metaprionota sculpta, was first described by Felder in 1874. It is found in French Guiana.

Butterflies and Moths of the World gives this name as a synonym of Lepidodes Guenée, 1852.

References

Calpinae
Monotypic moth genera